Diedie Traore (born 15 January 1999) is a French footballer playing for Sporting Kansas City II.

Career
Traore began his youth career with the Metz academy, before leaving in 2016. He joined Lithuanian A Lyga side Utenis Utena during the summer break in 2017. In January 2018, Traore attended an open tryout for United Soccer League club LA Galaxy II. After a successful trial, he signed with the team on 30 April 2018.

On 6 March 2019, Traore moved up to the senior LA Galaxy side.

On 5 March 2021, Traore and LA Galaxy mutually agreed to part ways.

Traore returned to France, signing with Championnat National 2 side SAS Épinal in November 2021.

On February 24, 2022 it was announced that Traore had signed with USL Championship side San Antonio FC. On June 30, 2022, the club announced it had reached a mutual agreement with the player to terminate his contract.

Personal life
Born in France, Traore is of Malian descent.

Career statistics

Club

References

External links
 

1999 births
Living people
Footballers from Paris
French footballers
French people of Malian descent
FK Utenis Utena players
LA Galaxy II players
LA Galaxy players
SAS Épinal players
San Antonio FC players
Sporting Kansas City II players
Association football defenders
A Lyga players
USL Championship players
Championnat National 2 players
French expatriate footballers
Expatriate footballers in Lithuania
French expatriate sportspeople in Lithuania
French expatriate sportspeople in the United States
Major League Soccer players
Expatriate soccer players in the United States